Meredith Ernest "Bud" Bordeaux (October 4, 1912 – March 25, 2014) was an American politician in the state of Maine.

Bordeaux served in the Maine House of Representatives from 1979 to 1982, as a Republican. He lived in Mount Desert, Maine, and turned 100 in 2012. Bordeaux died in March 2014 at the age of 101. He was predeceased by his wife, Grace Butler, who died in 2011.

References

1912 births
2014 deaths
American centenarians
Farmers from Maine
Republican Party members of the Maine House of Representatives
Men centenarians
People from Mount Desert Island
People from Hancock, Maine